Del Oro High School is located in Loomis, California, and is a part of the Placer Union High School District.  Del Oro High School opened for the instruction of freshmen and sophomores on September 28, 1959, one week after Colfax opened.  It was founded in 1958 and currently has over 1600 students attending.

The dropout rate is 2%, which is below the California state average.

Athletics
Del Oro's Division I ranked athletes compete in football, basketball, tennis, baseball, cross country, water polo, swim and dive, softball, track, soccer, Lacrosse, and wrestling.

Performing arts
The performing arts department at Del Oro consists of two music programs, choral and instrumental, a theatrical program, and a dance program.

Instrumental music
The oldest and most rooted, in Del Oro tradition, is the "band program," currently directed by Ben Duncan. The program consists of five ensembles: marching band offered in the Fall Semester; concert band offered in the Spring Semester; jazz band offered in the Spring Semester; winter percussion offered in the Spring Semester; and, winter guard offered in the spring semester.  None of the ensembles run year-round, so it is very common that students participate in the marching band in the fall and up to three of the other choices in the spring (in rare cases, a student may be able to participate in all ensembles).

The band program holds the Del Oro Golden Eagle Spectacular (an annual marching band competition for schools in Northern California and sometimes neighboring states) and more recently hosts the Del Oro Golden Eagle Winter Spectacular (an annual competition for winter percussion and winter guard ensembles).

Del Oro High School also offers, "Guitar" as an elective. This course provides students who are interested in the development of the guitar an opportunity to learn. This course is open to all students who choose to take it and no prior experience of guitar playing is necessary.

Choral music
Del Oro has two choral ensembles: Chorus, which is offered in the Fall Semester, and is open to all students. Concert Choir, offered in the Spring Semester is offered to students who audition. Both are directed by Lisa Murgo (preceded by Marlene Astle).

Theater
The theater department's debut production was the American classic "You Can't Take it With You," written by George S. Kaufman and Moss Hart and directed by Jeffrey Johnson, co-founder of Del Oro's theatrical program.  It opened in late-2004, prior to the completion of the new theater facility, and was performed on the campus cafeteria stage.

The school received 10 Elly Award nominations, with one win, from the Sacramento Area Regional Theater Alliance for the performances of "The Foreigner" and "Noises Off" during the 2006-2007 school year.

Dance
The newest program started and was founded by a student named LaTasha Holland in 2006.

Fight song
The "Del Oro Fight Song" is an adaptation of the Washington State University Fight Song; in fact, the marching band plays exactly the same sheet music. The difference between the two fight songs are the lyrics.

Notable alumni

 Thomas E. Cooper – former Assistant Secretary of the Air Force through 1987
 Sally Edwards – member of Triathlon Hall of Fame
 Randy Fasani – former NFL quarterback
 James Irvin – professional MMA fighter
 Marcel Lachemann – former Major League Baseball manager and pitching coach
Frank Lopes, Jr - musician Hobo Johnson
 Mark McLemore – MLB pitcher for Minnesota Twins
 Don Verlin – men's basketball head coach at University of Idaho
 Alex Obert - current captain of the United States water polo team, competed in the 2016 Summer Olympics.
Austin Smotherman - Current PGA Tour Golfer

References

High schools in Placer County, California
Educational institutions established in 1958
Public high schools in California
1958 establishments in California